Warhawk is a vertically scrolling shooter published in 1986 by Firebird software. It was released for the Commodore 64, Atari 8-bit family, Amstrad CPC, and Atari ST.

The 8-bit versions of the game were budget-priced releases on Firebird's "Silver 199" sub-label.

Gameplay
The player must dodge and destroy obstacles along a vertically scrolling screen. The end of each level has a large number of ships flying at the player from many angles.

Reception
Computer and Video Games reviewed the Atari version which they compared to Uridium. They admired the asteroid graphics but thought those of the aliens were a little weak though "they swoop around fast enough to keep you on your toes". The game was awarded a 7/10 score.

Commodore User praised the game's presentation, graphics and enemy AI which was considered to be superior to Uridiums. It was given an 8/10 overall score.

Legacy
The following year, Proteus Developments developed Tanium, published by Players Software in 1988. The version for the Commodore 64 was declared to be Warhawk II on the title screen and the link was mentioned in reviews, but was not indicated in versions for other platforms.

A re-envisioning of the game was written for the Nintendo DS. While not a complete remake of the original game, it retains the same graphical feel and gameplay mechanics as the original. This project also involved Michael Ware from the development team of the 1986 release. Warhawk was remade for the ZX Spectrum Next with a version coded by Michael Ware and Jim Bagley. It received a physical release in Spring 2020.

References

1986 video games
Commodore 64 games
Atari 8-bit family games
Amstrad CPC games
Atari ST games
Telecomsoft games
Vertically scrolling shooters
Video games scored by Rob Hubbard
Video games developed in the United Kingdom